The following is a list of flags of Moldova.

National flag and State flag

Autonomous regions flags

Governmental flags

Military flag

Historical flags
For flags of Moldova as part of Romania (southern 1856 - 1878; all 1918 - 1940 and 1941 - 1944) see List of flags of Romania.

Municipal flags

Former national flag proposals

Transnistria

Standards

Historical flags

Political flags

Notes

External links

Moldova at Russian Centre of Vexillology and Heraldry

Lists and galleries of flags
Flags
Flags